The , also known as , is a Japanese left wing newspaper. It is associated with the new left, but independent from political parties and other organizations. 

There have been several other newspapers in history called Jimmin Shimbun.

Further reading

External links
 Official website 

Newspapers published in Japan